Lưu Thị Ly Ly (born October 20, 1998) is a member of the Vietnam women's national volleyball team.

Clubs 
  Thông tin Liên Việt Post Bank

Awards

Clubs 
 2016 Vietnam League -  Runner-Up, with Thông tin Liên Việt Post Bank
 2017 Vietnam League -  Runner-Up, with Thông tin Liên Việt Post Bank

National team

U23 team
 2017 Asian Championship -  Bronze Medal

U20 team
 2016 ASEAN Championship -  Silver Medal

References

1998 births
People from Ninh Bình province
Vietnamese women's volleyball players
Living people
Vietnam women's international volleyball players
Liberos
21st-century Vietnamese women